Bye Bye Germany is a 2017 internationally co-produced comedy film directed by Sam Garbarski.

Cast 
 Moritz Bleibtreu as David Bermann
 Antje Traue as Special Agent Sara Simon
 Tim Seyfi as Fajnbrot
 Mark Ivanir as Holzmann
 Anatole Taubman as Fränkel
 Hans Löw as Verständig
 Pál Mácsai as Szoros
 Tania Garbarski as Sonia

Plot 
Having survived the war and everything the Third Reich wanted to throw at them, David Bermann and his friends have only one plan in mind: to get to the States as soon as possible. But for that, they need money. Just when this design seems almost within his grasp, David gets fleeced of all his savings —and, all the dodgy shenanigans in his past finally catch up with him!

Reception 
On review aggregator website Rotten Tomatoes, the film holds an approval rating of 90%, based on 21 reviews, and an average rating of 7.5/10. On Metacritic, the film has a weighted average rating of 65 out of 100, based on 7 critics, indicating "generally favorable reviews".

Accolades

References

External links 

2017 comedy films
Belgian comedy films
Films set in 1946
German comedy films
2010s German films